Joe Moore is an English-born, Australian singer-songwriter from Sydney. He moved to Australia with his family in 2007 when he was 16. He is currently managed by Glenn Wheatley and signed to Universal Music Australia.

Career

2012–2015: Australia's Got Talent and The Voice
In 2012, Moore auditioned for series six of Australia's Got Talent. It was announced he came fourth in the finale on 25 July 2012.

After Australia's Got Talent, Moore continued busking in Sydney's Pitt Street Mall, which he had begun doing in 2008 and writing his own material. He shared the stage with John Farnham, Boyz II Men and Lionel Richie.

In 2015, Moore auditioned for the fourth series of The Voice Australia with a cover of "I See Fire" and joined The Madden Brothers team. He was announced runner-up to Ellie Drennan in the finale on 30 August. The following week, his independently released single "Symphony" made its ARIA Charts debut at number 52 for the week commencing 7 September 2015.

2015: After The Voice and A Thousand Lifetimes
On 10 September 2015, Moore announced he had signed with Universal Music Australia, with an album due in October. The lead single "Invincible" was released on 2 October. "Invincible debuted at number 68. His debut studio album, A Thousand Lifetimes was announced on 27 October with a release date of 6 November 2015.

In July 2016, Moore released a new single called, "Easy For You".

Discography

Studio albums

Extended plays

Singles

Influences
Moore lists influences including; Oasis, Stereophonics, Jet, Robbie Williams, Coldplay, David Bowie, Eric Clapton, Level 42, Michael Bublé, Jason Mraz, Train, Eagle-Eye Cherry, Newton Faulkner, Seth Lakeman, Gary Moore, John Mayer and Spring Chicken.

References

21st-century Australian musicians
Musicians from Sydney
Living people
1991 births
Australia's Got Talent contestants